Sara Ballantyne (born 20 November 1964 in Victoria, British Columbia) is a Canadian former field hockey player who competed in the 1988 Summer Olympics.

References

External links
 
 
 
 
 

1964 births
Living people
Field hockey players from Victoria, British Columbia
Canadian female field hockey players
Olympic field hockey players of Canada
Field hockey players at the 1988 Summer Olympics
Pan American Games medalists in field hockey
Pan American Games bronze medalists for Canada
Field hockey players at the 1987 Pan American Games
Medalists at the 1987 Pan American Games